Liisa is a Finnish and Estonian female given name. Its name day is 19 November in both countries. It originated as a variation of the name Lisa or Alisa. As of January 2013, there are more than 100,000 women registered in Finland with this name. It is listed by the Finnish Population Register Centre as one of the top 10 most popular female given names ever. As of 1 January 2020, 1,114 women in Estonia have the first name Liisa, making it the 169th most popular female name in the country. The name is most commonly found in Saare County.

Notable people
Some notable people who have this name include:

 Liisa Aibel (born 1972), Estonian actress
 Liisa Anttila (born 1974), Finnish orienteer
 Liisa Ehrberg (born 1988), Estonian cyclist
 Liisa Hyssälä (born 1948), Finnish politician 
 Liisa Jaakonsaari (born 1945), Finnish politician
 Liisa Kauppinen (born 1939), Finnish human rights activist 
 Liisa Laurila (born 1974), Finnish swimmer
 Liisa Lilleste (born 1985), Estonian footballer
 Liisa Merisalu (born 2002), Estonian footballer
 Liisa Mustonen (born 1969), Finnish actress
 Liisa Nevalainen (1916–1987), Finnish actress
 Liisa Oviir (born 1977), Estonian lawyer and politician 
 Liisa-Ly Pakosta (born 1969), Estonian politician
 Liisa Pulk (born 1985), Estonian actress
 Liisa Rantalaiho (b. 1933), Finnish sociologist
 Liisa Repo-Martell (born 1971), Canadian actor and artist
 Liisa Salmi (born 1914), Finnish speed skater
 Liisa Savijarvi (born 1963), Canadian skier
 Liisa Suihkonen (born 1943), Finnish cross-country skier
 Liisa Tuomi (1924–1989), Finnish actress
 Liisa Turmann (born 1990), Estonian curler 
 Liisa Veijalainen (born 1951), Finnish orienteer
 Liisa Winkler, Canadian model

See also
 Lisa (given name)
 Liisi

References

Estonian feminine given names
Finnish feminine given names